The Aerojet General X-8 was an unguided, spin-stabilized sounding rocket designed to launch a  payload to . The X-8 was a version of the prolific Aerobee rocket family.

Towards the end of World War II, the US Army and the California Institute of Technology's Jet Propulsion Laboratory had developed a meteorological sounding rocket, the WAC Corporal. The U.S. Army had also captured enough parts to assemble perhaps 100 German V-2 guided missiles. The Army determined that its Project Hermes would be extended to assemble and launch a number of the V-2s for military, technological and scientific purposes. Many of the V-2 components were damaged or useless. Thus the initial intent of the Army was to launch only 20 missiles.

The Army was to make space available on the V-2s for upper atmosphere research. Due to the limited number of V-2s, originally planned design of several competing sounding rockets continued. Jet Propulsion Laboratory initially favored its WAC Corporal despite its inadequacy. The competing rockets were the Applied Physics Laboratory's Aerobee and the Naval Research Laboratory's Neptune (Viking). The Army determined that it would refurbish and manufacture components as necessary to launch many more V-2s than originally intended, making most available for science.

The Aerobee was developed in response to the need for a sounding rocket to replace the dwindling numbers of V-2s. Design and initial development of the Aerobee occurred between June 1946 and November 1947.

The first Aerobees, the Navy RTV-N-8a1 and Army Signal Corps XASR-SC-1, used the Aerojet XASR-1  thrust air-pressurized  engine. Aerojet's XASR-1 was developed from the  thrust WAC-1 engine of the  WAC Corporal sounding rocket. The  USAF RTV-A-1 (X-8), Navy RTV-N-10 and Army XASR-SC-2s used the Aerojet XASR-2  thrust helium pressurized engine. In 1949 the Air Force instigated the development of a more powerful  Aerojet engine to replace the 2,600 lb.-thrust XASR-2. This was the  thrust helium-pressurized AJ 10-25. The USAF X-8A (RTV-A-1a) and USN RTV-N-10a used the seminal Aerojet AJ-10-25 (Air Force) or AJ-10-24 (Navy).

The Army Air Force's Air Research and Development Command, needing its own research programs, initiated Project MX-1011 and ordered 33 AJ-10-25 powered Aerobees as RTV-A-1s. That designation was later changed to  X-8. Ultimately the rocket was renamed again as RM-84. The number of X-8s flown came to 60 including 28 X-8s (RTV-A-1), 30 X-8As (RTVM-A-1a), 1 X-8B (RTV-A-1b) with a  thrust XASR-2 chemically pressurized engine, and 1 X-8C (RTV-A-1c) with a  thrust AJ 10-25s helium pressurized engine with no booster. The three X-8D with  thrust AJ 10-25, were never flown. A Navy experimental launch of a stretched Aerobee, the RTV-N-10b resulted in both services requesting improved Aerobees, known generically as Aerobee-Hi.

Operational history

At launch, an  thrust Aerojet 2.5KS18,000G solid rocket booster fired for 2.5 seconds. After booster jettison, a  thrust XASR-2 liquid fuel rocket burned for up to 40 seconds (depending on desired apogee). The X-8 recovery sequence was normally started as the rocket descended through about  feet when the fins were blown off to induce a drag producing tumble. At about   the nose cone was blown off the rocket and returned to Earth by parachute. A X-8A reached a maximum altitude of  Another reached a speed of Mach six. The payloads of the X-8s varied, averaging about 150 lbs. There were 30 X-8s, 30 X-8As, 1 X-8B, 2 X8-Cs and 3 X-8Ds delivered to the Air Force.

The first RTV-A-1 (X-8) flight was USAF-1, flown at Holloman Air Force Base (adjacent to the White Sands Proving Ground). USAF-1 was launched by an Air Force crew commanded by Major Phillip Calhoun, the Aerobee Project Officer, on 2 December 1949. Rocket performance was good. Telemetry returned some data. The X-Ray detector foils ruptured and returned no data. Parachute failure resulted in the nose cone containing the experiments to be lost. The nose cone was found in July 1950, the film was destroyed.

The next four flights saw the nose cone recovery parachutes fail.

USAF-6,  was a more typical X-8 Mission. It carried a payload of Pressure-Temperature detectors for the University of Michigan, an Air Force Cambridge Center multipurpose beacon, 6 channel PPM-AM system, a Ten channel data recorder supplied by Tufts College, and a camera to photograph a Sperry aspect gyro for the University of Michigan. USAF-6 reached an altitude of  before a flawless recovery.

From December 1949 until the last X-8A flight on 11/12/1956, the X-8s (RTV-A-1/RTV-A-1a)s flew a great variety of experiments. Typical payloads were solar radiation, temperature, pressure, photography, sky brightness, atmosphere composition,  winds, airglow, rocket performance, biological experiments, air density, day airglow, ionosphere, sodium studies, nitric oxide to produce a sporadic E layer, nitric oxide attempt to recombine atomic oxygen, sodium cloud ionization, solar spectrum and atmospheric composition. All but the last X-8 mission were flown from Holloman AFB. The last X-8 was flown for the Signal Corps Electronic Laboratory from Fort Churchill, Canada on 11/12/1956 and studied temperature and winds. After the X-8s Air Force Aerobees were known by their engine model numbers, either AJ-10-27 or AJ-10-34.

Variants
X-8 - 30
X-8A - 30
X-8B - 1
X-8C - 2
X-8D - 3

Specifications (general)

See also

References

External links

 Aerojet General RM-84/PWN-2 Aerobee-Hi (and earlier Aerobee variants)

Sounding rockets of the United States
X-8
Unmanned aerial vehicles of the United States
X-008